Zagheh-ye Bozorg-e Qaleh-ye Ranjbar (also Romanized as Zāgheh-ye Bozorg-e Qal‘eh-ye Ranjbar; also known as Zāgheh) is a village in Qalkhani Rural District, Gahvareh District, Dalahu County, Kermanshah Province, Iran. At the 2006 census, its population was 167, in 32 families.

References 

Populated places in Dalahu County